Coleophora vernoniaeella is a moth of the family Coleophoridae. It is found in the United States, including Kentucky and Missouri.

The larvae feed on the leaves of Vernonia and Helianthus species. They create an annulate case.

References

vernoniaeella
Moths of North America
Moths described in 1878